Bannisterite is a mineral named in honor of mineralogist and x-ray crystallographer Dr. Frederick Allen Bannister (1901-1970). It is a calcium-dominant member of the ganophyllite group, and was previously identified as ganophyllite in 1936, but otherwise it is structurally related to the stilpnomelane group. It was approved by the IMA in 1967.

Properties 
Bannisterite grows in flat platy aggregates. It has smooth cleavages without ruling. It is a pleochroic mineral, which is an optical phenomenon. Depending on which axis the mineral is being inspected on, it appears as it changes colors. on the x axis, the mineral is seen in a colorless to pale yellow color. Common impurities include zinc and sodium. It occurs in sulfuric zinc deposits, as well as at silicate-carbonate hosted zinc deposits. It is associated with quartz, baryte, fluorite, rhodonite, sphalerite, galena, calcite, the apophyllite group and the amphibole supergroup. It doesn't have luminescent properties, under long, or shortwave ultraviolet light. It has a type locality in the Benallt mine in Wales, United Kingdom, and in the Franklin mine, New Jersey, United States. It mainly consists of oxygen (44.64%) silicon (21.43%) and manganese (17.95%), but otherwise contains iron (5.23%), zinc (3.68%), aluminum (2.17%), magnesium (1.89%), hydrogen (1.09%), calcium (0.97%), potassium (0.84%) and sodium (0.12%). It is bladed, meaning it has thin lath-like crystals, and is prismatic, meaning the shape of the crystals are slender prisms. It has a barely detectable radioactivity due to it containing potassium. It has a 11.93 radioactivity measured in Gamma Ray American Petroleum Institute units. The concentration of the mineral measured per GRapi units is 8.39%.

References

Phyllosilicates
Monoclinic minerals
Radioactive minerals
Manganese minerals